In gambling parlance, making a book is the practice of laying bets on the various possible outcomes of a single event. The phrase originates from the practice of recording such wagers in a hard-bound ledger (the 'book') and gives the English language the term bookmaker for the person laying the bets and thus 'making the book'.

Making a 'book' (and the notion of overround)
A bookmaker strives to accept bets on the outcome of an event in the right proportions in order to make a profit regardless of which outcome prevails. See Dutch book and coherence (philosophical gambling strategy). This is achieved primarily by adjusting what are determined to be the true odds of the various outcomes of an event in a downward fashion (i.e. the bookmaker will pay out using his actual odds, an amount which is less than the true odds would have paid, thus ensuring a profit).

The odds quoted for a particular event may be fixed  but are more likely to fluctuate in order to take account of the size of wagers placed by the bettors in the run-up to the actual event (e.g. a horse race). This article explains the mathematics of making a book in the (simpler) case of the former event. For the second method, see Parimutuel betting.

It is important to understand the relationship between fractional and decimal odds. Fractional odds are those written a − b (a/b or a to b) mean a winning bettor will receive their money back plus a units for every b units they bet. Multiplying both a and b by the same number gives odds equivalent to a − b.
Decimal odds are a single value, greater than 1, representing the amount to be paid out for each unit bet. 
For example, a bet of £40 at 6-4 (fractional odds) will pay out £40 + £60 = £100. The equivalent decimal odds are 2.5; £40 × 2.5 = £100. We can convert fractional to decimal odds by the formula D = . Hence, fractional odds of a-1 (ie. b = 1) can be obtained from decimal odds by a = D − 1.

It is also important to understand the relationship between odds and implied probabilities:
Fractional odds of a-b (with corresponding decimal odds D) represent an implied probability of  = , e.g. 6-4 corresponds to  =  = 0.4 (40%).
An implied probability of x is represented by fractional odds of (1 − x)/x, e.g. 0.2 is (1 − 0.2)/0.2 = 0.8/0.2 = 4/1 (4-1, 4 to 1) (equivalently,  − 1 to 1), and decimal odds of D = .

Example
In considering a football match (the event) that can be either a 'home win', 'draw' or 'away win' (the outcomes) then the following odds might be encountered to represent the true chance of each of the three outcomes:

Home: Evens
Draw: 2-1
Away: 5-1

These odds can be represented as implied probabilities (or percentages by multiplying by 100) as follows:

By adding the percentages together a total 'book' of 100% is achieved (representing a fair book). The bookmaker, in his wish to avail himself of a profit, will invariably reduce these odds. Consider the simplest model of reducing, which uses a proportional decreasing of odds. For the above example, the following odds are in the same proportion with regard to their implied probabilities (3:2:1):

Home: 4-6
Draw: 6-4
Away: 4-1

By adding these percentages together a 'book' of 120% is achieved.

The amount by which the actual 'book' exceeds 100% is known as the 'overround', 'bookmaker margin'  or the 'vigorish' or 'vig': it represents the bookmaker's expected profit. Thus, in an "ideal" situation, if the bookmaker accepts £120 in bets at his own quoted odds in the correct proportion, he will pay out only £100 (including returned stakes) no matter what the actual outcome of the football match.
Examining how he potentially achieves this:

A stake of £60.00 @ 4-6 returns £100.00 (exactly) for a home win.
A stake of £40.00 @ 6-4 returns £100.00 (exactly) for a drawn match
A stake of £20.00 @ 4-1 returns £100.00 (exactly) for an away win

Total stakes received — £120.00 and a maximum payout of £100.00 irrespective of the result. This £20.00 profit represents a 16 % profit on turnover (20.00/120.00).

In reality, bookmakers use models of reducing that are more complicated than the model of the "ideal" situation.

Bookmaker margin in English football leagues 
Bookmaker margin in English football leagues decreased in recent years. The study of six large bookmakers between 2005/06 season and 2017/2018 season showed that average margin in Premier League decreased from 9% to 4%, in English Football League Championship, English Football League One, and English Football League Two from 11% to 6%, and in National League from 11% to 8%.

Overround on multiple bets

When a punter (bettor) combines more than one selection in, for example, a double, treble or accumulator then the effect of the overround in the book of each selection is compounded to the detriment of the punter in terms of the financial return compared to the true odds of all of the selections winning and thus resulting in a successful bet.

To explain the concept in the most basic of situations an example consisting of a double made up of selecting the winner from each of two tennis matches will be looked at:

In Match 1 between players A and B both players are assessed to have an equal chance of winning. The situation is the same in Match 2 between players C and D. In a fair book in each of their matches, i.e. each has a book of 100%, all players would be offered at odds of Evens (1-1). However, a bookmaker would probably offer odds of 5-6 (for example) on each of the two possible outcomes in each event (each tennis match). This results in a book for each of the tennis matches of 109.09...%, calculated by 100 × ( + ) i.e. 9.09% overround.

There are four possible outcomes from combining the results from both matches: the winning pair of players could be AC, AD, BC or BD. A bet of 100 units (for simplicity) on any of the four combinations would produce a return of 100 × (3/1 + 1) = 400 units if successful, reflecting decimal odds of 4.0.

The decimal odds of a multiple bet is often calculated by multiplying the decimal odds of the individual bets, the idea being that if the events are independent then the implied probability should be the product of the implied probabilities of the individual bets. So the decimal odds of the double bet is × = 1.833...×1.833... = 3.3611..., or fractional odds of 2.3611-1. This represents an implied probability of 29.752% (1/3.3611) and multiplying by 4 (for each of the four equally likely combinations of outcomes) gives a total book of 119.01%. Thus the overround has slightly more than doubled by combining two single bets into a double.

In general, the combined overround on a double (OD), expressed as a percentage, is calculated from the individual books B1 and B2, expressed as decimals, by OD = B1 × B2 × 100 − 100.
In the example we have OD = 1.0909 × 1.0909 × 100 − 100 = 19.01%.

This massive increase in potential profit for the bookmaker (19% instead of 9% on an event; in this case the double) is the main reason why bookmakers pay bonuses for the successful selection of winners in multiple bets: compare offering a 25% bonus on the correct choice of four winners from four selections in a Yankee, for example, when the potential overround on a simple fourfold of races with individual books of 120% is over 107% (a book of 207%). This is why bookmakers offer bets such as Lucky 15, Lucky 31 and Lucky 63; offering double the odds for one winner and increasing percentage bonuses for two, three and more winners.

In general, for any accumulator bet from two to i selections, the combined percentage overround of books of B1, B2, ..., Bi given in terms of decimals, is calculated by B1 × B2 × ... × Bi × 100 − 100. E.g. the previously mentioned fourfold consisting of individual books of 120% (1.20) gives an overround of 1.20 × 1.20 × 1.20 × 1.20 × 100 − 100 = 107.36%.

Settling winning bets

In settling winning bets either decimal odds are used or one is added to the fractional odds: this is to include the stake in the return. The place part of each-way bets is calculated separately from the win part; the method is identical but the odds are reduced by whatever the place factor is for the particular event (see Accumulator below for detailed example). All bets are taken as 'win' bets unless 'each-way' is specifically stated. All show use of fractional odds: replace (fractional odds + 1) by decimal odds if decimal odds known. Non-runners are treated as winners with fractional odds of zero (decimal odds of 1). Fractions of pence in total winnings are invariably rounded down by bookmakers to the nearest penny below. Calculations below for multiple-bet wagers result in totals being shown for the separate categories (e.g. doubles, trebles etc.), and therefore overall returns may not be exactly the same as the amount received from using the computer software available to bookmakers to calculate total winnings.

Singles

Win single

E.g. £100 single at 9-2; total staked = £100

Returns = £100 × (9/2 + 1) = £100 × 5.5 = £550

Each-way single

E.g. £100 each-way single at 11-4 (  odds a place); total staked = £200

Returns (win) = £100 × (11/4 + 1) = £100 × 3.75 = £375

Returns (place) = £100 × (11/20 + 1) = £100 × 1.55 = £155

Total returns if selection wins = £530; if only placed = £155

Multiple bets

Each-way multiple bets are usually settled using a default "Win to Win, Place to Place" method, meaning that the bet consists of a win accumulator and a separate place accumulator (Note: a double or treble is an accumulator with 2 or 3 selections respectively). However, a more uncommon way of settling these type of bets is "Each-Way all Each-Way" (known as "Equally Divided", which must normally be requested as such on the betting slip) in which the returns from one selection in the accumulator are split to form an equal-stake each-way bet on the next selection and so on until all selections have been used. The first example below shows the two different approaches to settling these types of bets.

Double

E.g. £100 each-way double with winners at 2-1 (  odds a place) and 5-4 (  odds a place); total staked = £200

Returns (win double) = £100 × (2/1 + 1) × (5/4 + 1) = £675

Returns (place double) = £100 × (2/5 + 1) × (5/16 + 1) = £183.75

Total returns = £858.75

Returns (first selection) = £100 × (2/1 + 1) + £100 × (2/5 + 1) = £440 which is split equally to give a £220 each-way bet on the second selection)

Returns (second selection) = £220 × (5/4 + 1) + £220 × (5/16 + 1) = £783.75

Total returns = £783.85

Note: "Win to Win, Place to Place" will always provide a greater return if all selections win, whereas "Each-Way all Each-Way" provides greater compensation if one selection is a loser as each of the other winners provide a greater amount of place money for subsequent selections.

Treble

E.g. £100 treble with winners at 3-1, 4-6 and 11-4; total staked = £100

Returns = £100 × (3/1 + 1) × (4/6 + 1) × (11/4 + 1) = £2500

Accumulator

E.g. £100 each-way fivefold accumulator with winners at Evens (  odds a place), 11-8 (  odds), 5-4 (  odds), 1-2 (all up to win) and 3-1 (  odds); total staked = £200

Note: 'All up to win' means there are insufficient participants in the event for place odds to be given (e.g. 4 or fewer runners in a horse race). The only 'place' therefore is first place, for which the win odds are given.

Returns (win fivefold) = £100 × (1/1 + 1) × (11/8 + 1) × (5/4 + 1) × (1/2 + 1) × (3/1 + 1) = £6412.50

Returns (place fivefold) = £100 × (1/4 + 1) × (11/40 + 1) × (5/16 + 1) × (1/2 + 1) × (3/5 + 1) = £502.03

Total returns = £6914.53

Full-cover bets

Trixie

Returns (3 doubles) = £10 × [(4/7 + 1) × (2/1 + 1) + (4/7 + 1) × (11/10 + 1) + (2/1 + 1) × (11/10 + 1)] = £143.14

Returns (1 treble) = £10 × (4/7 + 1) × (2/1 + 1) × (11/10 + 1) = £99.00

Total returns = £242.14

Yankee

Returns (6 doubles) = £10 × [(1/3 + 1) × (5/2 + 1) + (1/3 + 1) × (6/4 + 1) + (1/3 + 1) × (1/1 + 1) + (5/2 + 1) × (6/4 + 1) + (5/2 + 1) × (1/1 + 1) + (6/4 + 1) × (1/1 + 1)] = £314.16

Returns (4 trebles) = £10 × [(1/3 + 1) × (5/2 + 1) × (6/4 + 1) + (1/3 + 1) × (5/2 + 1) × (1/1 + 1) + (1/3 + 1) × (6/4 + 1) × (1/1 + 1) + (5/2 + 1) × (6/4 + 1) × (1/1 + 1)] = £451.66

Returns (1 fourfold) = £10 × (1/3 + 1) × (5/2 + 1) × (6/4 + 1) × (1/1 + 1) = £233.33

Total returns = £999.15

Trixie, Yankee, Canadian, Heinz, Super Heinz and Goliath form a family of bets known as full cover bets which have all possible multiples present. Examples of winning Trixie and Yankee bets have been shown above. The other named bets are calculated in a similar way by looking at all the possible combinations of selections in their multiples. Note: A Double may be thought of as a full cover bet with only two selections.

Should a selection in one of these bets not win, then the remaining winners are treated as being a wholly successful bet on the next 'family member' down. For example, only two winners out of three in a Trixie means the bet is settled as a double; only four winners out of five in a Canadian means it is settled as a Yankee; only five winners out of eight in a Goliath means it is settled as a Canadian. The place part of each-way bets is calculated separately using reduced place odds. Thus, an each-way Super Heinz on seven horses with three winners and a further two placed horses is settled as a win Trixie and a place Canadian. Virtually all bookmakers use computer software for ease, speed and accuracy of calculation for the settling of multiples bets.

Full cover bets with singles

Patent

Returns (3 singles) = £2 × [(4/6 + 1) + (2/1 + 1) + (11/4 + 1)] = £16.83

Returns (3 doubles) = £2 × [(4/6 + 1) × (2/1 + 1) + (4/6 + 1) × (11/4 + 1) + (2/1 + 1) × (11/4 + 1)] = £45.00

Returns (1 treble) = £2 × (4/6 + 1) × (2/1 + 1) × (11/4 + 1) = £37.50

Total returns = £99.33

Patent, Lucky 15, Lucky 31, Lucky 63 and higher Lucky bets form a family of bets known as full cover bets with singles which have all possible multiples present together with single bets on all selections. An examples of a winning Patent bet has been shown above. The other named bets are calculated in a similar way by looking at all the possible combinations of selections in their multiples and singles.

Should a selection in one of these bets not win, then the remaining winners are treated as being a wholly successful bet on the next 'family member' down. For example, only two winners out of three in a Patent means the bet is settled as a double and two singles; only three winners out of four in a Lucky 15 means it is settled as a Patent; only four winners out of six in a Lucky 63 means it is settled as a Lucky 15. The place part of each-way bets is calculated separately using reduced place odds. Thus, an each-way Lucky 63 on six horses with three winners and a further two placed horses is settled as a win Patent and a place Lucky 31.

Algebraic interpretation

Returns on any bet may be considered to be calculated as 'stake unit' × 'odds multiplier'. The overall 'odds multiplier' is a combined decimal odds value and is the result of all the individual bets that make up a full cover bet, including singles if needed. E.g. if a successful £10 Yankee returned £461.35 then the overall 'odds multiplier' (OM) is 46.135.

If a, b, c, d... represent the decimal odds, i.e. (fractional odds + 1), then an OM can be calculated algebraically by multiplying the expressions (a + 1), (b + 1), (c + 1)... etc. together in the required manner and subtracting 1. If required, (decimal odds + 1) may be replaced by (fractional odds + 2).

Examples
3 selections with decimal odds a, b and c.
Expanding (a + 1)(b + 1)(c + 1) algebraically gives abc + ab + ac + bc + a + b + c + 1. This is equivalent to the OM for a Patent (treble: abc; doubles: ab, ac and bc; singles: a, b and c) plus 1.
Therefore to calculate the returns for a winning Patent it is just a case of multiplying (a + 1), (b + 1) and (c + 1) together and subtracting 1 to get the OM for the winning bet, i.e. OM = (a + 1)(b + 1)(c + 1) − 1. Now multiply by the unit stake to get the total return on the bet.

E.g. The winning Patent described earlier can be more quickly and simply evaluated by the following:

Total returns = £2 × [(4/6 + 2) × (2/1 + 2) × (11/4 + 2) − 1] = £99.33

Ignoring any bonuses, a 50 pence each-way Lucky 63 (total stake £63) with 4 winners [2-1, 5-2, 7-2 (all  odds a place) and 6-4 ( odds a place)] and a further placed horse [9-2 ( odds a place)] can be relatively easily calculated as follows:

Returns (win part) = 0.50 × [(2/1 + 2) × (5/2 + 2) × (7/2 + 2) × (6/4 + 2) − 1] = £172.75
or more simply as 0.50 × (4 × 4.5 × 5.5 × 3.5 − 1)

Returns (place part) = 0.50 × [(2/5 + 2) × (5/10 + 2) × (7/10 + 2) × (6/16 + 2) × (9/10 + 2) − 1] = £11.79
or more simply as 0.50 × (2.4 × 2.5 × 2.7 × 2.375 × 2.9 − 1)

Total returns = £184.54

For the family of full cover bets that do not include singles an adjustment to the calculation is made to leave just the doubles, trebles and accumulators. Thus, a previously described winning £10 Yankee with winners at 1-3, 5-2, 6-4 and Evens has returns calculated by:

£10 × [(1/3 + 2) × (5/2 + 2) × (6/4 + 2) × (1/1 + 2) − 1 − [(1/3 + 1) + (5/2 + 1) + (6/4 + 1) + (1/1 + 1)]] = £999.16

In effect, the bet has been calculated as a Lucky 15 minus the singles. Note that the total returns value of £999.16 is a penny higher than the previously calculated value as this quicker method only involves rounding the final answer, and not rounding at each individual step.

In algebraic terms the OM for the Yankee bet is given by:

OM = (a + 1)(b + 1)(c + 1)(d + 1) − 1 − (a + b + c + d)

In the days before software became available for use by bookmakers and those settling bets in Licensed Betting Offices (LBOs) this method was virtually de rigueur for saving time and avoiding the multiple repetitious calculations necessary in settling bets of the full cover type.

Settling other types of winning bets

Up and down

Returns (£20 single at 7-2 ATC £20 single at 15-8) = £20 × 7/2 + £20 × (15/8 + 1) = £127.50

Returns (£20 single at 15-8 ATC £20 single at 7-2) = £20 × 15/8 + £20 × (7/2 + 1) = £127.50

Total returns = £255.00

Note: This is the same as two £20 single bets at twice the odds; i.e. £20 singles at 7-1 and 15-4 and is the preferred manual way of calculating the bet.

Returns (£10 single at 5-1 ATC £10 single on 'loser') = £10 × 5/1 = £50

Note: This calculation of a bet where the stake is not returned is called "receiving the odds to the stake" on the winner; in this case receiving the odds to £10 (on the 5-1 winner).

Round Robin

A Round Robin with 3 winners is calculated as a Trixie plus three Up and Down bets with 2 winners in each.

A Round Robin with 2 winners is calculated as a double plus one Up and Down bet with 2 winners plus two Up and Down bets with 1 winner in each.

A Round Robin with 1 winner is calculated as two Up and Down bets with one winner in each.

Flag and Super Flag bets may be calculated in a similar manner as above using the appropriate full cover bet (if sufficient winners) together with the required number of 2 winner- and 1 winner Up and Down bets.

Note: Expert bet settlers before the introduction of bet-settling software would have invariably used an algebraic-type method together with a simple calculator to determine the return on a bet (see below).

Algebraic interpretation

If a, b, c, d... represent the decimal odds, i.e. (fractional odds + 1), then an 'odds multiplier' OM can be calculated algebraically by multiplying the expressions (a + 1), (b + 1), (c + 1), ... etc. together in the required manner and adding or subtracting additional components. If required, (decimal odds + 1) may be replaced by (fractional odds + 2).

Examples

OM (2 winners) = (2a − 1) + (2b − 1) = 2(a + b − 1)
OM (1 winner) = a − 1

OM (3 winners) = (a + 1) × (b + 1) × (c + 1) − 1 − (a + b + c) + 2 × [(a + b − 1) + (a + c − 1) + (b + c − 1)] = (a + 1)(b + 1)(c + 1) + 3(a + b + c) − 7
OM (2 winners) = (a + 1) × (b + 1) − 1 − (a + b) + 2 × (a + b − 1) + (a − 1) + (b − 1) = (a + 1)(b + 1) + 2(a + b) − 5or more simply as OM = ab + 3(a + b) − 4
OM (1 winner) = 2 × (a − 1) = 2(a − 1)

OM (4 winners) = (a + 1) × (b + 1) × (c + 1) × (d + 1) − 1 − (a + b + c + d) + 2 × [(a + b − 1) + (a + c − 1) + (a + d − 1) + (b + c − 1) + (b + d − 1) + (c + d − 1)]= (a + 1)(b + 1)(c + 1)(d + 1) + 5(a + b + c + d) − 13
OM (3 winners) = (a + 1) × (b + 1) × (c + 1) − 1 − (a + b + c) + 2 × [(a + b − 1) + (a + c − 1) + (b + c − 1)] + (a − 1) + (b − 1) + (c − 1) = (a + 1)(b + 1)(c + 1) + 4(a + b + c) − 10
OM (2 winners) = (a + 1) × (b + 1) − 1 − (a + b) + 2 × (a + b − 1) + 2 × [(a − 1) + (b − 1)] = (a + 1)(b + 1) + 3(a + b) − 7or more simply as OM = ab + 4(a + b) − 6
OM (1 winner) = 3 × (a − 1) = 3(a − 1)

See also
Statistical association football predictions
Glossary of bets offered by UK bookmakers

Notes

References

. Definitive, and extensively revised and updated 3rd edition on the history, theory, practice and mathematics of bookmaking, plus the mathematics of off-course betting, bets and their computation and liability control.

Further reading
 "Finding an Edge", Ron Loftus, US-SC-North Charleston: Create Space., 2011, 144pp.
 "How to make a book", Phil Bull, London: Morrison & Gibb Ltd., 1948, 160pp.
 "The book on bookmaking", Ferde Rombola, California: Romford Press, 1984, 147pp. .
 The Art of Bookmaking, Malcolm Boyle, High Stakes Publishing 2006.
 Secrets of Successful Betting, Michael Adams, Raceform, 2002.
 The Mathematics of Games and Gambling, Edward W. Packel, Mathematical Association of America, 2006.
 The Mathematics of Gambling, Edward O. Thorp, L. Stuart, 1984.
 "Maximin Hedges", Jean-Claude Derderian, Mathematics Magazine, volume 51, number 3. (May, 1978), pages 188–192.
 "Carnap and de Finetti on Bets and the Probability of Singular Events: The Dutch Book Argument Reconsidered" Klaus Heilig, The British Journal for the Philosophy of Science, volume 29, number 4. (December, 1978), pages 325–346.
 "Tests of the Efficiency of Racetrack Betting Using Bookmaker Odds", Ron Bird, Michael McCrae, Management Science, volume 33, number 12 (December, 1987), pages 152–156.
 "Why is There a Favourite-Longshot Bias in British Racetrack Betting Markets", Leighton Vaughan Williams, David Paton. The Economic Journal, volume 107, number 440 (January, 1997), pages 150–158.
 Optimal Determination of Bookmakers' Betting Odds: Theory and Tests, by John Fingleton and Patrick Waldron, Trinity Economic Paper Series, Technical Paper No. 96/9, Trinity College, University of Dublin, 1999.
 "Odds That Don't Add Up!", Mike Fletcher, Teaching Mathematics and its Applications, 1994, volume 13, number 4, pages 145–147.
 "Information, Prices and Efficiency in a Fixed-Odds Betting Market", Peter F. Pope, David A. Peel, Economica, New Series, volume 56, number 223, (August, 1989), pages 323–341.
 "A Mathematical Perspective on Gambling", Molly Maxwell, MIT Undergraduate Journal of Mathematics, volume 1, (1999), pages 123–132.
 "Probability Guide to Gambling: The Mathematics of dice, slots, roulette, baccarat, blackjack, poker, lottery and sport bets", Catalin Barboianu, Infarom, 2006, 316pp. .

Gambling mathematics
Wagering